Robinson Run is a  long 2nd order tributary to Chartiers Creek in Allegheny and Washington Counties, Pennsylvania.

Variant names
According to the Geographic Names Information System, it has also been known historically as:
Robinson's Run

Course
Robinson Run rises about 0.5 miles southeast of Candor, Pennsylvania and then flows northeasterly to join Chartiers Creek at Glendale.

Watershed
Robinson Run drains  of area, receives about 38.6 in/year of precipitation, has a wetness index of 339.05, and is about 51% forested.

See also
 List of rivers of Pennsylvania

References

Rivers of Pennsylvania
Rivers of Allegheny County, Pennsylvania
Rivers of Washington County, Pennsylvania